Stolbovoy Island is a long and narrow island off the southwest side of the New Siberian archipelago in the eastern part of the Laptev Sea. It is located 184 km away from the Siberian coast and 100 km southwest of Kotelny Island, being thus quite detached from the New Siberian island group, although it belongs to the Lyakhov Islands subgroup of the New Siberian Islands.

History
According to Russian tradition in 1690 the Boyar Maxim Mukhoplev visited the island and found a number of crosses, the tombs of Russian seafarers who had previously been there. Stolbovoy was first charted by Yakov Sannikov in 1800.

There was a meteorological station located on the north-west coast of the island at the time of the USSR. In 2012 an automatic GLONASS (Global Navigation Satellite System) monitoring facility was installed in the same spot. Presently the island belongs to the Sakha Republic administrative division of the Russian Federation.

Geography and climate
Stolbovoy Island's area is approximately 170 km². Its length is 47 km and its maximum width is 10 km. The northernmost point of the island was named Cape Toll, in honor of Russian explorer Eduard Toll. There is a 5 km long lake in the northeast of the island. It is separated from the sea by a narrow spit. There is a 13 km long river, the Stolbovoy River, running northwards across the central part of the island.

The highest point of Stolbovoy Island is 222 meters. The island has 15–70 m high rocky cliffs, the lower relief down to the beach being dominated by conical mound-like stony structures.

The climate in the area is exceptionally severe, with prolonged, bitter winters, so that the waters of the Laptev Sea around Stolbovoy Island are covered by ice most of the year.

Geology
Tectonically deformed sedimentary rocks that accumulated during Late Jurassic to Early Cretaceous periods comprise Stolbovoy Island. These turbidites, which contain the fossils of marine pelecypods, consist of beds of sandstone coarsely and rhythmically interbedded with beds of siltstone and argillite. These rocks have been folded into a synclinal structure, thrust faulted, and intruded by small quartz diorite dikes.

Vegetation
Cryptogam herb covers practically barren Stolbovoy Island. All vegetation consists of dry to wet barren
landscapes with scattered, herbs, lichens, mosses, and liverworts. Sedges,
dwarf shrubs, and peaty mires are normally absent. These plants form a sparse (2-40%) and low-growing plant cover. The plants often grow in coarse-grained, often calcareous sediments

Views

See also
Lyakhovsky Islands
Kigilyakh
Baydzharakh

References

External links
anonymous, nd, Laptev Sea Alfred Wegener Institute for Polar and Marine Research - Research Unit Potsdam, Potsdam, Germany.
BirdLife International, 2008, RU118 Stolbovoy island. BirdLife's online World Bird Database: the site for bird conservation. Version 2.1. Cambridge, UK: BirdLife International.
Grigoriev, M., nda, ice-affected pebble beach of Stolbovoy Island Alfred Wegener Institute for Polar and Marine Research - Research Unit Potsdam, Potsdam, Germany
Grigoriev, M., ndb, rocky cliffs (15-70 m high) of Stolbovoy Island Alfred Wegener Institute for Polar and Marine Research - Research Unit Potsdam, Potsdam, Germany

New Siberian Islands
Lyakhovsky Islands
Islands of the Sakha Republic